The 2022 Florida Atlantic Owls football team represented Florida Atlantic University as a member of Conference USA (C-USA) during the 2022 NCAA Division I FBS football season. Led by Willie Taggart in this third and final season as head coach, the Owls compiled an overall record of 5–7 with a mark of 4–4 in conference play, placing in a three-way tie for fourth in C-USA. Florida Atlantic played home games at FAU Stadium in Boca Raton, Florida.

During the previous season, on October 21, 2021, Florida Atlantic accepted the invitation to join the American Athletic Conference (AAC) and will become a full member on July 1, 2023. The 2022 season was the program's last as a member of C-USA.

Preseason

C-USA media day 
The Conference USA media day was held on July 27 at Globe Life Field in Arlington, Texas. The Owls were predicted to finish fourth in the conference's preseason poll.

Schedule 
Florida Atlantic and Conference USA (C-USA) announced the 2022 football schedule on March 30, 2022.

Game summaries

Charlotte

at Ohio 

Ohio recovered from an early deficit and then had to hold on to avoid surrendering a late 17 point lead in winning a shootout against Florida Atlantic.  Quarterback Kurtis Rourke and freshman kicker Nathanial Vakos both earned MAC East Player of the Week awards.

No. 21 (FCS) Southeastern Louisiana

UCF

at Purdue

at North Texas

Rice

at UTEP

UAB

at FIU

at Middle Tennessee

Western Kentucky

Coaching staff

References 

Florida Atlantic
Florida Atlantic Owls football seasons
Florida Atlantic Owls football